John Ness Beck (November 11, 1930 – June 25, 1987) was a composer and arranger of choral music. He was best known for his very popular and accessible settings of traditional Sacred music. Beck was a conductor and arranger of international renown. His works are highly celebrated and performed by high school, college, church, community, and professional choirs across the globe today.

Biography

John Ness Beck was born in Warren, Ohio. After graduating from Warren G. Harding High School in 1948, he enrolled at The Ohio State University. In 1952 he graduated from Ohio State with Bachelor of Arts and Bachelor of Science degrees with a major in English. After working for a year in Student Union activities at the State College of Washington, he spent two years in the U.S. Army. During this time, he became increasingly involved in arranging for various musical groups. After his discharge from military service, he returned to Ohio State and completed Bachelor of Music and Master of Arts degrees in music with composition as his major.

Mr. Beck was a faculty member of the Ohio State University School of Music for seven years, teaching harmony and theory. He left the university to become owner and manager of The University Music House, a retail sheet music store in Columbus. In this capacity, he was able to observe the business side of the music industry, gaining  insight into the complexities of music publishing and merchandising. As his compositions found their way into print and popularity, he joined forces in 1972 with John Tatgenhorst in the creation of Beckenhorst Press. His reputation as a composer and his experience as a choral director soon led to an increasing demand for appearances as guest conductor and lecturer at various musical clinics and festivals throughout the country. He remained active in the field until his death from cancer in 1987.

John Ness Beck Foundation
Mr. Beck established the John Ness Beck Foundation in 1987, only a few months before his death. The Foundation was established in memory of Randall Thompson and Joseph W. Clokey. It recognizes outstanding achievement in choral composition and arrangement of traditional church music, enhances and furthers the careers, study, education and experience of promising composers and arrangers, and promotes and stimulates the learning of choral composition and traditional church music.

The stated goal of the foundation is to encourage and promote the writing of traditional sacred music. The Foundation has sought to honor this goal in several ways. For several years, scholarships were awarded to students from the Westminster Choir College and the Southern Baptist Theological Seminary who exhibited promise in the writing of sacred choral music. At present, the Foundation has embarked on a program which recognizes current composers of traditional sacred choral music by selecting two compositions yearly which best exemplify the type of writing that fit the criteria set forth by John Beck.

Arrangements and compositions

 Amazing Grace
 America the Beautiful
 And in That Day
 And the Child Grew
 Anthem of Unity
 The Armor of God
 As the Rain
 Assurance
 Battle Cry of Freedom
 Benediction (God Be With You Til We Meet Again)
 Canticle of Praise
 Celebration
 A Child's Noel
 Christmas Carols and Codas
--- Angels We Have Heard On High
--- The First Noel
--- Good Christian Men, Rejoice
--- Hark! the Herald Angels Sing
--- Joy to the World
--- While Shepherds Watched Their Flocks
 Christmas Welcome
 Consecration
 Contemporary Music for the Church Service
 Cry Aloud
 Devotion
 Divided Our Pathways
 Ease My Mind, Lord
 Easter Canticle
 The Easter Vigil of Mary Magdalene
 Every Perfect Gift
 Every Valley
 Exhortation
 Faith of Our Fathers
 Foundation
 Gethsemane
 Gloria
 The God of Abraham Praise
 God of Grace
 Have Ye Not Known?
 He Shall Feed His Flock
 Help Us Accept Each Other
 A Holy Festival
 A Hymn for Advent
 Hymn for Easter Day
 Hymn for Our Time
 Hymn of Courage
 Hymn of Fellowship
 Hymn to David
 Hymn to God the Father
 I Can Do All Things
 I Need Thee Every Hour
 If You Love Me
 In Heavenly Love
 In Memoriam
 Interpreted By Love
 It Is Well With My Soul
 A Joyful Noise
 Jubilant Canticle
 Jubilo, Jubilate
 The King of Love My Shepherd Is
 Kingsfold [I Feel the Winds of God Today]
 Let Us Break Bread Together
 Litany of Thanksgiving
 Look for a Sunrise
 Lord, Here Am I
 Lullaby
 The Name of Jesus
 A New Heart I Will Give You
 O Come, Let Us Sing
 O for a Thousand Tongues to Sing
 O Love That Will Not Let Me Go
 Of the Father's Love Begotten
 Offertory
 Once in Royal David's City
 Osanna
 Prayer to Jesus
 Psalm 24
 Psalm 46
 Psalm 67
 Psalm 121
 The Quiet Heart
 Rejoice in the Lord Alway
 Rejoice, the Lord Is King
 The Shepherds
 Sing Unto Him
 Something
 Song of Exaltation
 Song of Hope
 Song of Moses
 Song of the Apostle
 Speak to Me, Lord
 The Spirit Leads On and On
 A Spiritual Song
 Still, Still With Thee
 Strong Son of God, Immortal Love
 The Sunlit Hour
 Tenting Tonight
 Thanksgiving!
 There's a Song in the Air
 Thou Art God!
 Two Carols for Advent
 Upon This Rock
 Variants On an Irish Hymn
 Victory
 Visions of St. John
 We Gather Together
 When Morning Gilds the Skies
 Where Is the Child?
 Who Shall Separate Us?
 Ye Shall Go Out With Joy
 The Young Lions

External links 
John Ness Beck Foundation

1930 births
1987 deaths
20th-century American composers
20th-century American conductors (music)
20th-century American male musicians
American choral conductors
American male conductors (music)
American male composers
Ohio State University College of Arts and Sciences alumni
People from Warren, Ohio
Sacred music composers